Mohammad Tauqir (born 14 January 1972) is an Emirati cricketer. He is a UAE national. He is a  lower order batsman and off-spin bowler, he played his first game for UAE in the final of 1996 ACC Trophy (batting at 11 and not bowling). He has been part of the UAE team in the last three ICC Trophys and last six ACC Trophys. His best bowling performance came against Japan with 6–10 off 10 overs in the 2000 ACC Trophy.

His two One Day Internationals came when UAE played in the 2004 Asia Cup they lost by 116 runs to both India and Sri Lanka, Tauqir scored 55 against India. In 2004 he also played in the Hong Kong International Cricket Sixes. He made his Twenty20 International debut against Scotland in the 2015 ICC World Twenty20 Qualifier tournament on 9 July 2015.

Mohammad Tauqir also set the record for the oldest captain on captaincy debut in T20I history. He made his T20I debut as a captain at the age of 43, becoming the second oldest player to make his T20I debut behind Ryan Campbell of Hong Kong.

References

1972 births
Emirati cricketers
United Arab Emirates One Day International cricketers
United Arab Emirates Twenty20 International cricketers
Living people
Emirati cricket captains
Cricketers at the 2015 Cricket World Cup
Sportspeople from Dubai